The Hyatt Regency Barcelona Tower is a skyscraper hotel situated in the district of Bellvitge in L'Hospitalet de Llobregat (suburb of Barcelona), Catalonia, Spain.

The hotel opened in January 2006 as the Hesperia Tower. It was renamed NH Collection Barcelona Tower in 2016. It was again renamed Hesperia Barcelona Tower Hotel in early 2019. It was renamed Hyatt Regency Barcelona Tower on February 12, 2020, following a major renovation.

It was the tallest building in L'Hospitalet until the Plaça d'Europa Towers were constructed. It is topped by a glass dome that contains a revolving restaurant. It was designed by the British architect Richard Rogers together with Luis Alonso and Sergi Balaguer. It has 280 rooms, a  sq m congress centre, and a sports centre.

See also 
 List of tallest buildings and structures in Barcelona

References

External links 
 
official website
Building description and pictures

Skyscraper hotels in Barcelona
Buildings and structures completed in 2006
Richard Rogers buildings
Hotels established in 2006
2006 establishments in Spain